Harold Methven (9 October 1908 – 1987) was an English professional footballer who played in the Football League for Mansfield Town and Portsmouth.

References

1908 births
1987 deaths
English footballers
Association football forwards
English Football League players
Gresley F.C. players
Portsmouth F.C. players
Sheffield United F.C. players
Scunthorpe United F.C. players
Loughborough Corinthians F.C. players
Mansfield Town F.C. players
Tunbridge Wells F.C. players